Owen Wilder Vaccaro (born 2005/2006) is an American child actor. He has appeared in feature films since 2015, including Daddy's Home (2015), Daddy's Home 2 (2017), and in the lead role of The House with a Clock in Its Walls (2018).

Life and work
Vaccaro was born in 2005/2006. He has an older sister and a younger brother. He lives in Atlanta, Georgia. In first grade, he acted in a play and became interested in acting further. An agent helped him get roles on the independent films The Product of Me and Rom, which led to his role in the 2015 feature film Daddy's Home. He attended Holy Innocents' Episcopal School in Atlanta.

He co-starred in the Paramount Pictures films Daddy's Home (2015) and Daddy's Home 2 (2017). The Hartford Courant noted of his appearance in Daddy's Home that "it has to be said that the child actors playing the kids, Megan (Scarlett Estevez) and Dylan (Owen Vaccaro) actually give real comic performances". In 2018, Deadline Hollywood reported that Vaccaro was "poised to breakout [sic]" for playing the lead role of Lewis Barnavelt in the Universal Pictures film The House with a Clock in Its Walls, with Jack Black and Cate Blanchett. In 2021, he gave an interview for Vanity Teen magazine, concurrent with his role in the Netflix film Finding ʻOhana.

Filmography

Nominations

References

External links

American male child actors
Male actors from Atlanta
Living people
2000s births